The Tompkins Table is an annual ranking that lists the Colleges of the University of Cambridge in order of their undergraduate students' performances in that year's examinations. Two colleges—Darwin and Clare Hall—do not have undergraduate students and do not feature in the list. It was created in 1981 by Peter Tompkins, then a third-year undergraduate mathematics student at Trinity College, who compiled it for many years. It was formerly published by The Independent. Since 2016, it has been published by Varsity, a student newspaper of the University of Cambridge. It is not an official University of Cambridge table. It does not take account of students who are not candidates for Honours degrees, or those who have failed to gain a degree. It was not published in 2020 or 2021 as a result of the restrictions to the examination process brought about as a result of the COVID-19 pandemic.

Rankings

Current rankings
Initially, it only included final year exams but since 1997 has covered all exams for which grades are allocated. The table allocates 5 points for a First Class degree, 3 points for an Upper Second (known also as a 2.i), 2.5 points for a Second Undivided (A second class degree that isn't divided into Upper or Lower), 2 points for a Lower Second (a 2.ii), 1 point for a Third and no points for someone only granted an allowance towards an Ordinary Degree. The scores in each subject are then weighted to a common average, to avoid the bias towards colleges with higher proportions of students entered for subjects which receive higher average grades. The result is expressed as a percentage of the total number of points available. The differences between the highest places on the table are usually very slight. Christ's College was the top college in 2019, after coming top in 2018 following seven years in which Trinity College came top. The rankings are not officially endorsed by the University. Since Darwin College and Clare Hall admit only graduate students, they do not feature in this undergraduate ranking. Some of the mature colleges, including St. Edmund's College, Hughes Hall, Lucy Cavendish College, and Wolfson College, tend to perform relatively poorly in the Tompkins Table, but have significantly more graduate students than undergraduate students, so the results here are not representative of the majority of the student population of each of these colleges. 

Below is the table for 2022:

Past rankings

Similar league tables

Baxter tables
Certain Colleges of the University of Cambridge commission similar tables called Baxter Tables from Martin Baxter who is a financial analyst specialising in mathematical modelling and who developed the Electoral Calculus web site. Baxter tables rank colleges' undergraduate students by their year and subject separately and are delivered in July or August. They are compiled using published Class Lists, which do not include students who are not candidates for Honours degrees, or those who have failed to gain a degree, or those whose names the Council have determined should be withheld from public display. They are meant for internal use of Colleges but not the University, being distributed to the Senior Tutors of the Colleges , with the full tables not being published publicly or outside of the Colleges, and some students being unaware of their existence. However, the rankings of Colleges in the Baxter Tables are sometimes referred to by Colleges in publicly available literature,  and the methodology used to compile the Baxter Tables is also available. There is also a 'value-added' table, which shows how students' results improve over the course of their years at Cambridge, and is intended to give a measure or indication of the quality of teaching at the different Colleges. However, with such small sample sizes, the amount of meaningful information which can be extracted from these tables is questionable.

Norrington table
The corresponding ranking for Oxford colleges is the Norrington Table. Since 1986, when the University of Oxford adopted split second-class degrees, the Norrington Table has adopted the same method of scoring as the Tompkins Table, but without the weighting attached to individual subject scores.

See also
Norrington Table

References

External links 
Tompkins Table 2015
Tompkins Table 2014
Tompkins Table 2013
Tompkins Tables 2000–2007
Tompkins Table 1999
Tompkins Tables 1997, 1998

1981 introductions
Culture of the University of Cambridge
History of the University of Cambridge
University and college rankings
Universities in the United Kingdom